Ar-Rihiya is a Palestinian town located six kilometers southwest of Hebron. The town is in the Hebron Governorate southern West Bank. According to the Palestinian Central Bureau of Statistics, the town had a population of over 3,949 in 2007.

History
Ceramics from the Byzantine era have been found here.

Ottoman era
French explorer Victor Guérin visited  the place in 1863, which he called Khirbet el-Harayeh. Local fellahins inhabited ancient underground storage areas.

In 1883, the PEF's Survey of Western Palestine described the place as being a "large ruin with caves and cisterns, appears to be an ancient site".

British Mandate era
In the 1922 census of Palestine conducted by the British Mandate authorities, 'Al Rihiyeh had a population 231 inhabitants, all Muslims. This had increased slightly at the time of the 1931 census to 243 Muslims, in 38 inhabited houses.

In the 1945 statistics  the population of Ar-Rihiya was 330 Muslims, who owned 2,659 dunams of land  according to an official land and population survey. 136 dunams were plantations and irrigable land, 1,093 for cereals, while 25 dunams were built-up (urban) land.

Jordanian era
In the wake of the 1948 Arab–Israeli War, and after the 1949 Armistice Agreements, Ar-Rihiya came under Jordanian rule. It was annexed by Jordan in 1950.

In 1961, the population of Rihiya was  555.

Post-1967
Since the Six-Day War in 1967, Ar-Rihiya has been under Israeli occupation.

Footnotes

Bibliography

External links
Welcome To al-Rihiya
Survey of Western Palestine, Map 21:    IAA, Wikimedia commons
 Ar Rihiya Village (Fact Sheet),  Applied Research Institute–Jerusalem, ARIJ
 Ar Rihiya Village Profile, ARIJ
 Ar Rihiya VillageArea Photo, ARIJ
The priorities and needs for development in Ar Rihiya village based on the community and local authorities’ assessment, ARIJ

Villages in the West Bank
Hebron Governorate
Municipalities of the State of Palestine